Established in 1981, NUS-ISS previously known as the Institute of Systems Science (Abbreviation) at the National University of Singapore runs graduate education, professional development programmes, consultancy, applied research and career services. 

NUS-ISS is appointed the National Continuing Education & Training (CET) Institute (NCI) for the National Infocomm Competency Framework (NICF) by SkillsFuture Singapore (SSG) and the Infocomm Media Development Authority of Singapore (IMDA).

History

Founding
In the 1980s, when the world was on the verge of high-technology industrialisation, Singapore discovered that it had only 900 IT professionals in the whole country. The country needed at least 700 technology professionals a year, but the university was only graduating 40 per year.

Focusing on graduate IT education, as part of Singapore's National IT Plan, NUS-ISS was tasked by the Committee for National Computerisation (CNC) to be the pinnacle of manpower training in information technology. This initiative was led by Dr Tony Tan, then Chairman of the CNC and Ministry for Trade and Industry (the seventh President of Singapore 2011 to 2017), and Mr Philip Yeo, the first Chairman of the National Computer Board, who established a group tasked to lead the technological development of Singapore.

With the support of IBM Singapore, a four-year partnership with NUS was secured to guide the development and growth of the Institute. The Institute of Systems Science was officially founded in 1981.

Foray into research and development
NUS-ISS ventured into large-scale Research & Development activities in 1985, securing a 4-year partnership with IBM Singapore for their support in developing NUS-ISS’s applied research capability. Later on, the NUS-ISS R&D Group spearheaded SingaLab in 1992, Imagine Lab (later renamed Pixaround.com) in 1996, and Star+Globe Technologies (later acquired by Languageware.net and renamed Wholetree.com) in 1997. In 1998, to consolidate R&D efforts in Singapore, the NUS-ISS R&D arm was merged with the NCB Information Technology Institute and renamed the Kent Ridge Digital Labs.

Postgraduate programmes
It launched its very first programme – the Graduate Diploma in Systems Analysis – in 1981. Later on, it launched the Graduate Diploma in Knowledge Engineering in 1989, and the Graduate Diploma in Software Engineering in 1993. The Master of Technology in Software Engineering and Knowledge Engineering programmes were launched in 1996, together with the NUS School of Computing and School of Engineering. In 2013, it launched the Master of Technology in Enterprise Business Analytics programme together with NUS.

Singapore e-Government Leadership Centre
In 2006, the Singapore e-Government Leadership Centre (eGL) was set up in collaboration with Lee Kuan Yew School of Public Policy and Infocomm Development Authority of Singapore.

See also 
 National University of Singapore

References

Educational institutions established in 1981
1981 establishments in Singapore